Johnny Austin (December 23, 1910 – February 14, 1983) was an American jazz trumpeter from Vineland, New Jersey.

Career 
Austin played trumpet with the Glenn Miller Orchestra, parting ways with that band in 1939. He formed the Johnny Austin Orchestra in 1947. Austin's playing can be heard on recordings of Jan Savitt.

References

1910 births
1983 deaths
American jazz trumpeters
American male trumpeters
People from Vineland, New Jersey
20th-century American musicians
20th-century trumpeters
20th-century American male musicians
American male jazz musicians
Glenn Miller Orchestra members